Guangqing Expressway connects the cities Guangzhou and Qingyuan in the Chinese province of Guangdong.

Expressways in China
Transport in Guangdong